Claudine van de Kieft (born 14 July 1972) is a Dutch former cricketer who played as a bowler. She appeared in 5 One Day Internationals for the Netherlands in 2001, all against Pakistan.

Her ODI best bowling figures came in the Netherlands' first win of the series, taking 2/21 from 6 overs as her side won by 57 runs.

References

External links

1972 births
Living people
Dutch women cricketers
Netherlands women One Day International cricketers